In motion pictures, whether for film (cinema), television, or streaming, de-aging is a visual effects technique used to make an actor or actress look younger, especially for flashback scenes.  This is often accomplished via digitally editing the image or using computer-generated imagery (CGI) overlays or touch-ups. Some media will even create de-aged digital actors from scratch or with a mixture of stand-ins and CGI.

Motion pictures employing digital de-aging techniques

List of films
The following is a list of films, in chronological order of release, that employ de-aging techniques:

List of television series
The following is a list of television series, in chronological order of release, that employ de-aging techniques:

Virtual actors in motion pictures
In some cases, a young version of a character is not played by the original actor but by a virtual actor, even though the actor being represented is usually still alive. This is usually accomplished with some combination of CGI, a body double, and a voice double or archival audio. Examples of actors who were replaced by virtual actors to portray their younger selves include:

List of films

List of television series

References

Film and video technology
Ageing
Visual effects
Special effects